Banus may refer to:

Banus, first-century desert-dwelling Jewish ascetic, teacher of Titus Flavius Josephus
Camila Banus (born 1990), American actress
Gran Hotel Guadalpin Banús, luxury five hotel in Puerto Banús, Marbella, Spain
Maria Banuș (1914–1999), Romanian poet, essayist, prose writer and translator
Puerto Banús, marina in the area of Nueva Andalucía, to the southwest of Marbella, Spain on the Costa del Sol

See also
Babanusa
Bahnus
Banu (disambiguation)